Angel: After the Fall, also known as Angel: Season 6, is a comic book published by IDW Publishing. Written by Brian Lynch and plotted with Joss Whedon, the series is  a canonical continuation of the Angel television series, and follows the events of that show's final season. Angel: After the Fall was prompted by IDW Publishing and Joss Whedon after the success of Dark Horse Comics' Buffy the Vampire Slayer Season Eight which is the official comic continuation of Angel'''s mothershow, Buffy the Vampire Slayer. Angel: After the Fall sees the heroic vampire, Angel, coping with the apocalyptic aftermath of the television series after he took over and subsequently betrayed the demonic law firm, Wolfram & Hart. The city of Los Angeles has since been sent to hell by Wolfram & Hart as a result of Angel's actions. The series follows his attempts to rescue the people he has sworn to protect. The first issue was released on November 21, 2007.

Originally intended as a 12-issue limited series, After the Fall expanded into a 17-issue Angel series. After the Fall was then followed by an ongoing series, with rotating writers and artists but without the input of Joss Whedon. In addition to this, After the Fall has also spawned multiple spin-offs of its own. Spike: After the Fall bridges the gap between Spike's "First Night" mini-arc and his first appearance in After the Fall over four issues. A second five-issue spin-off, Angel: Only Human, picks up after #23, following Gunn and Illyria. A four-issue mini-series, Spike: The Devil You Know was released, teaming up Spike with Eddie Hope for a story set between Angel issues #32 and #33. A fourth four-issue spin-off featuring Illyria, titled Angel: Illyria: Haunted, was released beginning in November 2010. IDW also announced an ongoing Spike title, another "canon" title featuring explicit Buffy Season Eight crossovers.

In the editor's column in the back of the Buffy the Vampire Slayer: Riley one-shot released by Dark Horse Comics, editor Scott Allie announced that the Angel comics would return to Dark Horse in late 2011.  It was officially announced on August 19, 2010 that the series would come to an end with a six-issue arc titled "The Wolf, the Ram, and the Heart," and Dark Horse reacquiring the license to publish Angel titles, beginning with a new line of comics named Angel & Faith (co-starring Faith, 25 issues) in August 2011, tying in with a launch of Buffy Season Nine. The planned Spike ongoing spin-off instead became an eight issue mini-series.

Publication history
Following the success of Dark Horse Comics' ongoing series Buffy the Vampire Slayer Season Eight, an official continuation to the television series Buffy the Vampire Slayer, series creator Joss Whedon wished to continue the story of Buffy spin-off Angel in the same medium. In September 2006, comic book writer Brian Lynch met Joss Whedon by chance in a restaurant near his home where he told Whedon about the imminent release of a spin-off comic by himself and artist Franco Urru, Spike: Asylum, published by IDW and based upon the character of Spike, a central character in both Buffy and Angel. To Lynch's surprise, Whedon was thrilled with Spike: Asylum, and Joss felt confident he had found a writer capable of capturing his characters' voices in the new medium, and was impressed with Franco's unique style. Whedon would later email Lynch, asking to meet up with him again in the same restaurant. Working together, the two plotted the events of a now 17-issue limited series for a continuation of the Angel saga, drawing from elements of Whedon's plan for a sixth televised season of Angel and several ideas proposed by Lynch. Whedon gave Lynch the freedom to write the series himself, only overseeing the project as if in the role of an executive producer.

Development into an ongoing series
The series later spun off into an ongoing series, with Kelley Armstrong taking over for her run, called Aftermath (#18–22). Brian Lynch returned for three stories, focusing on Gunn (#23), Drusilla (#24–25) (co-written with Juliet Landau) and Angel & Spike (#26–27). At the San Diego Comic-Con 2009 it was announced that Eisner Award-winning writer Bill Willingham was taking over as ongoing writer with issue #28 with a six-issue arc named "Immortality for Dummies" launching in December 2009, joined by artist Brian Denham. The series showed how Angel is kidnapped by the newly formed 'Immortality Incorporated'. While Angel fights to escape, his son Connor takes over the reins of Angel Investigations. Willingham finished his run on the series with #38, then David Tischman and Mariah Huehner wrote a six-issue arc titled "The Wolf, the Ram, and the Heart" (#39–44) that concluded the final Angel story arc at IDW Publishing before it moved to Dark Horse Comics.

Spin-offs
On March 11, 2008, it was announced that there would be a 4 issue spin-off titled Spike: After the Fall from July 2008, which will chronicle the time in between the events of the series finale "Not Fade Away" and After the Fall, continuing directly from the Angel: After the Fall issue "First Night, Part Three," focusing on the characters of Spike and Illyria. A second spin-off miniseries, Angel: Only Human, focuses on Gunn and Illyria following the After the Fall Epilogue wherein both seek redemption and an opportunity to come to terms with their humanity and the good and evil within them both.

Brian Lynch later announced a second, this-time-ongoing Spike spin-off from the Angel: After the Fall franchise. Spike will be set "a few months" after Spike has left hell, and feature in its supporting cast Groosalugg, Beck from Spike: Asylum, Betta George and Jeremy from Spike: After the Fall. Due to Dark Horse Comics' use of the Angel character in the Buffy Season Eight storyline "Twilight", Whedon allowed Lynch use of Buffy character Willow Rosenberg for his Spike series. Additionally, it is to feature the supporting cast Spike brings alongside him to Season Eight in "Last Gleaming" and act as a canonical lead-in to Buffy Season Eight, and therefore a spin-off to both.

Premise
The premise of the series is that Los Angeles is feeling the aftermath of main character Angel taking a stand against the demonic Senior Partners in season five, who have retaliated by literally sending Los Angeles to hell. The series picks up some time after the season five finale, "Not Fade Away" and shows that Wesley remains contractually bound to the sinister Wolfram & Hart and the Partners after his death, Gunn has become a vampire capturing victims under the pretense he is rescuing them, that Angel's son Connor, ex-girlfriend Nina and old acquaintance Gwen are working to provide a safehouse for the people of Los Angeles under siege by demons, and that Spike now lives under the protection of Illyria who is no longer in control of her powers, unpredictably assuming Fred Burkle's appearance and personality at times. Angel himself, along with a dragon he befriended, is trying his best to remain a champion of good under the circumstances.

According to Whedon, the absence of budget constraints allows Angel's world to expand in ways that were never possible with the television series, "It will definitely use Season 6's proposed stories as inspiration, but it's not exactly Season 6".

Publication

Maxi-series

Continuing series

Mini-series

Spike: After the Fall

Angel: Only Human

Spike: The Devil You Know

Spike

Angel: Illyria: Haunted

One-shots

Collected editions
The series has been collected into a number of volumes:

Reception

Initial reviews were generally favorable. Troy Brownfield of Newsarama believed the most enjoyable aspect of the first issue "was seeing members of the extensive cast turn up again in surprising ways" and was pleased to see the return of minor characters from the television series. He described the reveal of Gunn as a vampire as "rather startling" and a "new injection of life" for the character. IGN's Bryan Joel believed that the first issue wasn't as accessible for new readers as that of Buffy Season Eight'', claiming that it read "less like the season premiere of the next season of Angel and more like episode 23 of season 5". He felt that the tone and characterization remained "true to its source material and fans will be happy to know Whedon's trademark dialogue knack is, for the most part, intact", but warned that the elaborate visuals of Angel flying through the hell-bound Los Angeles on a dragon may be too far removed from the television series for some readers. In an "Additional Take" review, Joel's colleague criticized the dialogue for lacking "the trademark witty banter" and worried that the hellish new setting might detract from the reality of the characters, describing it as "an interesting turn for what was once a very grounded fantasy series".

The artwork by Franco Urru was described as "reasonably good" by Brownfield, who claimed that while it captures the likeness of the characters, Urru's work lacks sharpness and "the weight of that terrific Tony Harris cover." IGN believed Urru is talented when he "lets loose" creating demons, but less impressive when it comes to matching characters to their respective actors.

The series has been a success for publisher IDW Publishing, who report that it has become the company's highest-charting comic book release ever.

References

External links
Angel at IDW Publishing
The Comic Book Guide to Buffy the Vampire Slayer
Buffyverse Comic Reviews

After the Fall
Comics based on Buffy the Vampire Slayer
Comics by Joss Whedon
Fantasy comics
Horror comics
Comics about magic